Irving Bedell Dudley (November 30, 1861November 27, 1911) was an American lawyer and diplomat, who served as United States Ambassador to Brazil from 1907 to 1911.

Biography 
Born in Ohio, the son of a minister and his wife, Dudley studied at Kenyon College, graduating in 1882, before continuing to study law at Columbian University (now George Washington University), graduating in 1885; he was admitted to the bar that year, and worked for the War Department.

Three years later, in 1888, he moved to San Diego, California, where he was later elected a judge in 1890.

A Republican, Dudley was appointed United States Minister to Peru by President William McKinley on June 25, 1897; he took up his post in September of that year.

In December 1906, McKinley's successor, Theodore Roosevelt, appointed Dudley to be United States Ambassador to Brazil, a post he took up in April 1907.

Illness dogged Dudley and his wife during his career, and would ultimately contribute to his death: after staying at Johns Hopkins Hospital for treatment of an unrelated complaint, he died there of heart failure three days before his birthday.

His wife would die in 1960, at the age of 87.

References

External links 
 Irving Bedell Dudley at the United States Department of State website.

1861 births
1911 deaths
People from Jefferson, Ohio
Columbian College of Arts and Sciences alumni
American lawyers
Ambassadors of the United States to Peru
Ambassadors of the United States to Brazil
19th-century American diplomats
20th-century American diplomats